In cricket, a five-wicket haul (also known as a "five–for" or "fifer") occurs when a bowler takes five or more wickets in a single innings. This is regarded by critics as a notable achievement, equivalent to a century from a batsman.

List of players 
As of July 2022, only 11 players have taken five-wicket hauls in all three international formats.

 indicates that the player is still an active international cricketer.

References

Cricket records and statistics